Saveh (also transliterated  as Sāwa) is a city in Markazi Province of Iran. As of 2016, the city had a population of 220,762 people.

History
In the 7th century BC it was a stronghold of the Medes. During the Parthian rule of Persia, it was called Saavakineh, and was one of the main hubs of the empire.

In the 11th century, it was a residence of the Daylamites and of the Seljuks. It was severely damaged by the Mongol invasion in the 13th century; it was restored during the Ilkhanids. Saveh was again sacked by the Timurids, but later grew under the Safavids. In the summer of 1725 the city was besieged and captured by the Afghans after a battle with Tahmasp Mirza. It eventually lost much of its importance when Tehran became the official capital of Persia and, in the mid-19th century, many of the inhabitants moved to Tehran.

Climate
Saveh has a hot semi-arid climate, (BSh) in Köppen climate classification and (BS) in Trewartha climate classification. Its summers are very hot and dry, while its winters are cool to cold and somewhat rainy.

Main sights
Jameh Mosque of Saveh, built by the Seljuks during the 11th century. It includes  a courtyard, porch, a 14 m tall minaret,  nocturnal areas, a tiled dome (14 m tall, with a diameter of 16 m) and two  altars with inscription in Kufic script.
Red Mosque of Saveh, also known as Enqelab Mosque. Dating to the Seljuk-era, it has a brickwork dome, an 11th-century minaret, three porticoes, and internally houses an altar with plasterwork and inscriptions.
Imamzadeh Soltan Seyed Eshaq Mausoleum
Sorkhdeh Bridge, south of the city
Khamseh-Abad caravansarai

Outside the city are the fortresses of Esmaeilieh (35 km), Alvir and Ardemin (56 km, on the road to Hamadan), as well as the archaeological sites of Aveh and Alishar.

Economy
Saveh produces large amounts of wheat and cotton. It is also well known for its pomegranates and melons. Kaveh Industrial City, the largest industrial city in Iran, is located in Saveh.

Legends
According to Iranian tradition, the Magi who visited the infant Jesus traveled from Saveh, and are buried among its ruins. Marco Polo described the tombs of the Magi in his travel book, Il Milione:

Saveh is said to have possessed one of the greatest libraries in the Middle East, until its destruction by the Mongols during their first invasion of Iran.

Another legend about Saveh is the Lake of Saveh. It is a lake which is said to have been located near the city. According to the legend mentioned in historical Persian texts, this lake dried out on the night of the birth of Muhammad. A recent investigation in the Zarand area between Tehran and Saveh has revealed some evidence of the existence of this lake in Zarand Plain.

Politics
In 2004, Saveh became only the second city in the history of the Islamic Republic to appoint a woman as mayor.

People
 Yusuf Adil Shah (former Mamluk and founder of the Bijapur Sultanate)

Gallery

References

External links

 Official website

Cities in Markazi Province